Phyllis Dalton, MBE, (born 16 October 1925) is a British costume designer known for her work on Lawrence of Arabia, Doctor Zhivago, Oliver!, The Princess Bride, Henry V and Much Ado About Nothing. She has received two Academy Awards, a BAFTA and an Emmy for her designs.

Career

Dalton was born in London, England. As a teenager she studied at the Ealing School of Art. After the outbreak of World War II she began training as a Wren at the code-breaking facility Bletchley Park which she said she found to be "unbelievably boring". In 1946, after being "demobbed" her grandmother entered her into a competition at Vogue Magazine where she won the opportunity to work as an assistant in the wardrobe department at Gainsborough Studios in Islington. Once there, she began cutting her teeth on films like Brian Desmond Hurst's A Christmas Carol; Alfred Hitchcock's The Man Who Knew Too Much and on Anatole Litvak's Anastasia.

By 1957 Dalton branched out on her own as a designer, making a name for herself on films like Island in the Sun directed by Robert Rossen (1957), with James Mason and Joan Fontaine; and Our Man in Havana (1959) directed by Carol Reed, starring Sir Alec Guinness and Noël Coward.

But perhaps her most memorable work may well be from her collaboration with Sir David Lean on two of his most critically acclaimed films: Lawrence of Arabia in 1962, starring Peter O'Toole and Omar Sharif; and again three years later on Dr. Zhivago starring Sharif and Julie Christie, for which she won her first Academy Award. For this particular film, Dalton and her team ended up making 3,000 individual costumes and putting together 35,000 individual items of clothing for the extras. The characters of Zhivago (Sharif) and Lara (Christie) each had approximately 90 costume combinations, and the other six other principal characters had an average of fifteen costume changes each. Because this was before CGI, by the time principal photography ended it was estimated the costume dept. had used up a total of 984 yards of fabric, 300,000 yards of thread, 1 million buttons and 7,000 safety pins.

In all, Dalton has designed costumes for more than forty films. Other notable ones include  Lord Jim (1965) again with O'Toole and directed by Richard Brooks, Oliver! (1968) with Ron Moody and Oliver Reed directed by Carol Reed; and The Princess Bride (1987) directed by Rob Reiner with Cary Elwes and Robin Wright. A few of the other stars who have worn her creations include Dame Elizabeth Taylor, Kim Novak, Dame Maggie Smith, Emma Thompson, Robin Williams, Keanu Reeves, Denzel Washington and Michael Palin.

Personal honours
In 2002, Dalton was awarded the MBE (Member of the Order of the British Empire) at The Queen's Birthday Honours for her services to the Film Industry as a Costume Designer.

Award history

Oscar nominations & wins
In the category of Best Costume Design.

38th Academy Awards-Won for Doctor Zhivago 
41st Academy Awards-Nominated for Oliver!. Lost to Romeo and Juliet.
62nd Academy Awards-Won for Henry V.

Emmy wins
In the category of Outstanding Costume Design for a Limited Series or a Special.

35th Primetime Emmy Awards-Won for The Scarlet Pimpernel.

BAFTA nominations and wins 
In the category of Best Costume Design.

22nd British Academy Film Awards-Nominated for Oliver!. Lost to Romeo and Juliet.
27th British Academy Film Awards-Won for The Hireling (1973). 
43rd British Academy Film Awards-Nominated for Henry V. Lost to The Adventures of Baron Munchausen.
47th British Academy Film Awards-Nominated for Much Ado About Nothing. Lost to The Piano.

Saturn wins
In the category of Best Costumes.

15th Saturn Awards-Won for The Princess Bride

References

External links

New York Times Listing
BAFTA Tribute 23 November 2012
BFI Index

1925 births
British costume designers
Living people
Designers from London
Emmy Award winners
Best Costume Design Academy Award winners
Best Costume Design BAFTA Award winners
Women costume designers
Women's Royal Naval Service ratings
Bletchley Park women
Royal Navy personnel of World War II
Members of the Order of the British Empire
Bletchley Park people
Women's Royal Naval Service personnel of World War II